Facundo Daniel Juárez (born November 8, 1993) is an Argentine professional footballer who plays for Club Atlético Mitre as a midfielder.

References

External links
 
 

1993 births
Living people
Argentine footballers
Association football midfielders
Club Atlético Mitre footballers
Club Celaya footballers
Dorados de Sinaloa footballers
Torneo Federal A players
Ascenso MX players
Argentine expatriate footballers
Argentine expatriate sportspeople in Mexico
Expatriate footballers in Mexico
People from Santiago del Estero
Sportspeople from Santiago del Estero Province